Commander John Cyril Edmondson, 2nd Baron Sandford, DSC (22 December 1920 – 13 January 2009) was a decorated Royal Navy officer, Church of England clergyman, conservationist and Conservative politician.  As a junior minister charged with a review of policy on national parks, he formulated what became known as the "Sandford principle": if there is a conflict between leisure use of the National Park, and protecting its natural state, the state of the park must be preserved.

Sandford was the eldest son of Albert Edmondson, 1st Baron Sandford, and his wife Edith Elizabeth (née Freeman, and sister to Ralph, Arnold and Peter). He was educated at St Cyprian's School, Eton, and the Royal Naval College, Dartmouth and later trained for Holy Orders at Westcott House, Cambridge. He served in the Royal Navy in the Second World War, notably at the landings in North Africa, Sicily and Normandy, where he was wounded. For his actions at Normandy he was awarded the Distinguished Service Cross. The latter year Sandford retired from the Royal Navy with the rank of Commander. In 1958 he was ordained in the Church of England and served as Curate of the Parish of St Nicholas in Harpenden from 1958 to 1963 and as Executive Chaplain to the Bishop of St Albans from 1965 to 1968.

Sandford succeeded his father in the barony in 1959 and took his seat on the Conservative benches in the House of Lords. He was an Opposition Whip in the House of Lords from 1966 to 1970 and served in the Conservative administration of Edward Heath as Joint Parliamentary Secretary to the Ministry of Housing and Local Government in 1970, as Joint Parliamentary Under-Secretary of State for the Department of the Environment from 1970 to 1973 and as Joint Parliamentary Under-Secretary of State for the Department of Education and Science from 1973 to 1974. As chair of the National Parks Policy Review Committee from 1971 to 1974 he gave name to the Sandford Principle. He was the Chairman of the Institution of Environmental Sciences, from 1977 to 1980, and was awarded Honorary Fellowship in 1981. Sandford has later served as President of the Council for Environmental Education from 1975 to 1984, as Chairman of the Community Task Force from 1977 to 1982 and of the Conference in South-East regional Planning from 1981 to 1988, as President of the Association of District Councils from 1980 to 1986 and as a Church Commissioner from 1981 to 1988. He remained a member of the House of Lords until the passing of the House of Lords Act 1999 removed the automatic right of hereditary peers sit in the upper chamber of Parliament.

Sandford married Catharine Mary, daughter of Reverend Oswald Andrew Hunt, in 1947. They had two sons and two daughters. His elder son, James, succeeded him.

Arms

References

Kidd, Charles, Williamson, David (editors). Debrett's Peerage and Baronetage (1990 edition). New York: St Martin's Press, 1990.

Who's Who 2007: An Annual Biographical Dictionary. London: A & C Black, 2007.
Commander the Rev Lord Sandford—Commander the Reverend 2nd Lord Sandford , who has died aged 88, had an impressive apprenticeship as a decorated naval officer and a Hertfordshire curate before becoming a Conservative whip and junior minister in the House of Lords., The Daily Telegraph, 9 February 2009.
Lord Sandford: seaman, clergyman, politician and conservationist, The Times, 23 January 2009.  Also Lives remembered: Lord Sandford and Reg Gutteridge, 29 January 2009.

1920 births
2009 deaths
Barons in the Peerage of the United Kingdom
Conservative Party (UK) hereditary peers
People educated at St Cyprian's School
Royal Navy officers of World War II
Recipients of the Distinguished Service Cross (United Kingdom)
20th-century English Anglican priests
Ordained peers
English conservationists
English environmentalists
Alumni of Westcott House, Cambridge
People educated at Eton College
Sandford